Michael Jay Feinstein (born September 7, 1956) is an American singer, pianist, and music revivalist. He is an archivist and interpreter for the repertoire known as the Great American Songbook. In 1988 he won a Drama Desk Special Award for celebrating American musical theatre songs. Feinstein is also a multi-platinum-selling, five-time Grammy-nominated recording artist.  He currently serves as Artistic Director for The Center for the Performing Arts in Carmel, Indiana.

Early life
Feinstein was born in Columbus, Ohio, the son of Florence Mazie (née Cohen), an amateur tap dancer, and Edward Feinstein, a sales executive for the Sara Lee Corporation and a former amateur singer. He is Jewish. At the age of five, he studied piano for a couple of months until his teacher became angered that he was not reading the sheet music she gave him, since he was more comfortable playing by ear. As his mother saw no problem with her son's method, she took him out of lessons and allowed him to enjoy music his own way.

Career
After graduating from high school, Feinstein worked in local piano bars for two years, moving to Los Angeles when he was 20. Through the widow of concert pianist-actor Oscar Levant, in 1977 he was introduced to Ira Gershwin, who hired him to catalogue his extensive collection of phonograph records. The assignment led to six years of researching, cataloguing and preserving the unpublished sheet music and rare recordings in Gershwin's home, Ira's works but also those of his composer brother George Gershwin. During Feinstein's years with Gershwin, he also got to know Gershwin's next-door neighbor, singer Rosemary Clooney, with whom Feinstein formed a close friendship lasting until Clooney's death. Feinstein served as musical consultant for the 1983 Broadway show My One and Only, a musical pastiche of Gershwin tunes.

By the mid-1980s, Feinstein was a nationally known cabaret singer-pianist famed for being a proponent of the Great American Songbook. In 1986, he recorded his first CD, Pure Gershwin (1987), a collection of music by George and Ira Gershwin.  He followed this with Live at the Algonquin (1986); Remember: Michael Feinstein Sings Irving Berlin (1987); Isn't It Romantic (1988), a collection of standards and his first album backed by an orchestra; and Over There (1989), featuring the music of America and Europe during the First World War. Feinstein recorded his only children's album, Pure Imagination, in 1992. In the 1987 episode "But Not For Me" of the TV series thirtysomething he sang "But Not For Me", "Love Is Here to Stay" and Isn't It Romantic? as parts of dream sequences.

By 1988, Feinstein was starring on Broadway in a series of in-concert shows: Michael Feinstein in Concert (April through June 1988), Michael Feinstein in Concert: "Isn't It Romantic" (October through November 1988), and Michael Feinstein in Concert: Piano and Voice (October 1990). He returned to Broadway in 2010, in a concert special duo with Dame Edna titled All About Me (March through April 2010).

1991 saw Feinstein's persona as a cabaret performer parodied in the third season of Mystery Science Theater 3000, which covered the Kaiju movie Gamera vs. Guiron. At the episode's close, Feinstein, played by the show's head writer Michael J. Nelson, and sang a cabaret version of the Gamera theme song to the characters Dr. Clayton Forrester and TV's Frank.

In the early 1990s, Feinstein embarked on a songbook project wherein he performed an album featuring the music of a featured composer, often accompanied by the composer. These included collaborations with Burton Lane (two volumes: 1990, 1992), Jule Styne (1991), Jerry Herman (Michael Feinstein Sings the Jerry Herman Songbook, 1993), Hugh Martin (1995), Jimmy Webb (Only One Life: The Songs of Jimmy Webb, 2003) and Jay Livingston/Ray Evans (2002). He has also recorded three albums of standards with Maynard Ferguson: Forever (1993), Such Sweet Sorrow (1995), and Big City Rhythms (1999).

In the late 1990s, Feinstein recorded two more albums of Gershwin music:  Nice Work If You Can Get It: Songs by the Gershwins (1996) and Michael & George: Feinstein Sings Gershwin (1998). Feinstein's albums in the 21st century have included Romance on Film, Romance on Broadway (2000), Michael Feinstein with the Israel Philharmonic Orchestra (2001), Hopeless Romantics (2005, featuring George Shearing), and The Sinatra Project (2008).

In 2000, the Library of Congress appointed Feinstein to its newly formed National Recording Preservation Board, an organization dedicated to safeguarding America's musical heritage.

In 2008, The Great American Songbook Foundation, founded by Feinstein, located its headquarters in Carmel, Indiana. The Foundation's two-fold mission includes the preservation, research, and exhibition of the physical artifacts, both published and non-published, of the Great American Songbook and educating today's youth about the music's relevance to their lives.  The Foundation houses an archive and reference library; plans exist for a free-standing museum.  The organization also holds an annual Great American Songbook Vocal Academy and Competition that invites high school students from around the country to compete in regional competitions; Feinstein has been a judge and mentor for the summer intensive each year from its inception in 2009. Finalists gather at the Foundation's headquarters for a vocal "boot camp" and final competition.  The winner receives scholarship money and the opportunity to perform with Michael at his cabaret in New York.

In 2009 Feinstein became the artistic director of The Center for the Performing Arts. located in Carmel, Indiana.  Construction of the $170-million, three-theater venue was completed in January 2011.  The Center is home to an annual international arts festival, diverse live programming, and The Great American Songbook Foundation.

In 2009, Feinstein teamed up with Cheyenne Jackson to create a nightclub act titled "The Power of Two". The show was hailed by The New York Times as "passionate", "impeccably harmonized" and "groundbreaking". Variety acclaimed it as "dazzlingly entertaining". Their act became one of the most critically acclaimed shows of 2009, and the duo created a studio album from the material, The Power of Two that included their cover of the Indigo Girls song of the same name.

In addition to doing more than 150 live performances per year, Feinstein has appeared on a number of television series, documentaries, and talk shows.

In 2010, PBS aired Michael Feinstein's American Songbook, a three-part television documentary that depicts the history of the American popular song up to 1960, as well as Feinstein's own life and career.

As of June 2011, Feinstein has written the score for two new stage musicals, The Night They Saved Macy's Parade and The Gold Room.

His Manhattan nightclub, Feinstein's at Loews Regency, presented the top talents of pop and jazz from 1999 to 2012, including Rosemary Clooney, Liza Minnelli, Glen Campbell, Barbara Cook, Diahann Carroll, Jane Krakowski, Lea Michele, Cyndi Lauper, Jason Mraz and Alan Cumming. The club was closed in December 2012 due to a year-long complete renovation of the Regency Hotel. Feinstein opened a new nightclub, Feinstein's at the Nikko in San Francisco's Nikko Hotel in May 2013, Feinstein's/54 Below at New York's Studio 54 in 2015 and also plans for a future nightclub in London.

Since 2012, Feinstein has been the host of the weekly, one-hour radio program Song Travels with Michael Feinstein®, produced by South Carolina ETV Radio and distributed by NPR. On the program, Feinstein explores the legendary songs of 20th century America. The series surveys the passage of American popular song throughout the American landscape, evolving with each artist and performance. Podcast highlights of the show are also available under the title Song Travels Express.

Feinstein was named Principal Pops Conductor for the Pasadena POPS in 2012 and made his conducting debut in June 2013 to good reviews. In 2016, Feinstein's contract with the Pasadena POPS was extended through 2019. Under Feinstein's leadership, the Pasadena POPS has quickly become the nation's premier presenter of the Great American Songbook in the orchestral arena, delivering definitive performances of rare orchestrations and classic arrangements.

Feinstein's memoir The Gershwins and Me: A Personal History in Twelve Songs about working for Ira Gershwin was published in the fall of 2012, accompanied by a CD of Feinstein performing the Gershwin brothers' music discussed in the book.

In April 2013 Feinstein released a new CD, Change Of Heart: The Songs of André Previn, (Concord) in collaboration with composer-conductor-pianist André Previn, with an album celebrating Previn's repertoire from his catalog of pop songs that have most commonly been featured in motion pictures. The album opens with "(You've Had) A Change of Heart".

On October 31, 2014, Feinstein's Michael Feinstein at the Rainbow Room premiered on PBS, with guest stars. The special is part of the 2014 PBS Arts Fall Festival, a primetime program with 11 weekly programs of classic Broadway hits and music from around the country, as well as some award-winning theater performances.

Feinstein has appeared numerous times as a presenter on Turner Classic Movies. After cohosting with Robert Osborne for a night in January 2015, he returned to the channel as a guest host in August 2016 and December 2017, appearing in dozens of wraparounds on the channel.

Personal life
In October 2008, Feinstein married his longtime partner, Terrence Flannery.  The ceremony was performed by famed family court and television judge Judith Sheindlin, also known as Judge Judy. Feinstein and Flannery have homes in New York, Los Angeles, and Indiana.

Discography

References

Notes

External links

 
 Michael Feinstein's American Songbook
 Official fan club
 Great American Songbook Foundation
 The Center for the Performing Arts
 
 

Michael Feinstein Interview NAMM Oral History Library (2020)

1956 births
Living people
American archivists
American cabaret performers
American male singers
American jazz singers
American music historians
American male non-fiction writers
20th-century American Jews
Concord Records artists
American gay musicians
Jewish cabaret performers
American LGBT singers
Singers from Ohio
Nonesuch Records artists
People from Carmel, Indiana
Musicians from Columbus, Ohio
Traditional pop music singers
LGBT cabaret performers
LGBT Jews
LGBT people from Ohio
20th-century American pianists
American male pianists
Jazz musicians from Ohio
21st-century American pianists
20th-century American male musicians
21st-century American male musicians
American male jazz musicians
Historians from Ohio
20th-century LGBT people
21st-century LGBT people
21st-century American Jews